Girlhood is the second and final studio album by Australian rock band the Preatures, released on 11 August 2017 through Universal Music Australia. The album peaked a number 13 on the ARIA Charts.

The band said the album "is about the contradictions of being a modern woman."

Reception

Rhian Daly from DIY Mag said "Girlhood sparkles with creativity, from climactic ambient motifs to riffs that sound like they've been discovered in a long-forgotten record collection."

Track listing

Charts

References

2017 albums
The Preatures albums
Albums produced by Jack Moffitt (musician)